Jules Sylvester (born Julian Richard Sylvester; 13 November 1950) is a British wild animal trainer, actor, television presenter and snake wrangler who works in films as well as television.

Early life
He was born in Devon, England, and raised in Kenya where he was first introduced to snake catching at age 16. He served in the Rhodesia Regiment during the Rhodesian Bush War from 1973-1974.

Career
He has appeared in numerous television shows including a series of appearances on The Tonight Show with Jay Leno and his own 2002 series Wild Adventures.  He handled the snakes in the film Snakes on a Plane.  He was also a guest on The Bernie Mac Show. He has also made multiple appearances on Spike TV's 1000 Ways to Die, in segments dealing with animal-related deaths. 
In 2006, he claimed that after 40 years of snake handling he had never been bitten. He also appeared as a snake handler in an episode of CSI: Crime Scene Investigation, "Got Murder."

He also professionally trains mammals including rhinos, wolves and lions.

In 2012, he appeared in Animal Movers in Episode 2: "The Tortoise and the Hare-Raising Cobra." He transported Cobras to Florida.

On 19 February 2020, he appeared in Ryan's Mystery Playdate in Season 2 Episode 20, the first segment "Ryan's Jungle Lovin' Playdate". Later that year, Sylvester handled ants on the set of scenes for "The Guy for This", the third episode of the fifth season of Better Call Saul.

Personal life
He is married to Sue Sylvester in 1987.

Filmography

Film

Television

References

External links

1950 births
British male film actors
British male television actors
20th-century British male actors
21st-century British male actors
British television presenters
British emigrants to Kenya
White Kenyan people
Living people
Foreign volunteers in the Rhodesian Security Forces